The Florida Oaks is a Grade III American Thoroughbred horse race for three-year-old fillies over the distance of  miles on the turf scheduled annually in mid-March at Tampa Bay Downs in Oldsmar, Florida. The event currently carries a purse of $200,000.

History

The race was inaugurated on 10 March 1984, at a distance of seven furlongs on the dirt and was won by Sure Too Explode who was ridden by the Tampa Bay Downs track leading jockey Rick Luhr in a time of 1:24. The next year, the distance was changed in 1985 to  miles and has remained so to date. 

The Florida Oaks was first upgraded to  Grade III status by the American Graded Stakes Committee (AGSC) in 1996, but was downgraded to listed status in 2004. 

It returned to Grade III in 2008 but was again downgraded for 2011. 

In 2011 Tampa Bay Downs officials decided to switch the race to the turf. The AGSC restored the Grade III designation for the 2013 edition.

Two Florida Oaks winners, Luv Me Luv Me Not in 1992 and Secret Status in 2000, went on to win the Kentucky Oaks at Churchill Downs.

Records
Speed record:
 miles turf – 1:41.89   Tapicat  (2013)
 miles dirt – 1:43.65  Don't Forget Gil (2009)

Margins:
9 lengths  – R Lady Joy  (2005)

Most wins by a jockey:
 4 - Jose Lezcano (2005, 2012, 2014, 2015)

Most wins by a trainer:
 4 - Chad C. Brown (2014, 2021, 2022, 2023)

Most wins by an owner:
 3 - William S. Farish III (1995, 2000, 2001)

Winners

Legend:

 
 

Notes:

§ Ran as an entry

See also
List of American and Canadian Graded races

External sites
Tampa Bay Downs Media Guide 2021

References

1984 establishments in Florida
Horse races in Florida
Tampa Bay Downs
Flat horse races for three-year-old fillies
Turf races in the United States
Graded stakes races in the United States
Recurring sporting events established in 1984
Sports competitions in Tampa, Florida
Grade 3 stakes races in the United States